Kondia or Konda was the name of a Mansi principality which existed independently until the mid-18th century. The last native Prince to be awarded the title "Prince of Konda" by the Russian Emperor was in 1842. The Russian Emperors themselves possessed the title "Sovereign and Grand Prince of Konda".

Kondia is one of the many provinces mentioned in the full official title of Russian Tsars.

See also 
Konda (disambiguation)

Historical regions in Russia
Russian Empire